Eupithecia chilensis is a moth in the family Geometridae. It is found in Chile.

References

Moths described in 2004
chilensis
Moths of South America
Endemic fauna of Chile